Patrick Tissier (born August 24, 1952) is a French serial killer and rapist who was convicted of killing three people from 1971 to 1993 in the southern regions of France. His case, along with that of Christian Van Geloven, led to a reform in the penal code in regards to the treatment of child murderers.

Early life
Little is known about Tissier's childhood. He was born on August 24, 1952 in Bourges, the middle from a total of five children born to a couple who were often violent towards one another. According to his own claims later on, his mother, whom he adored, secretly had many lovers, while his father violently beat him and his siblings, often calling them "dogs". At one point, one of his brothers committed suicide.

In 1963, Tissier's mother left the family when he was just 11. After finishing high school, he apprenticed as an electrician before entering into a relationship with a woman named Maria Luna.

First crimes
In 1965, the 12-year-old Tissier attempted to rape one of his sisters, but was eventually persuaded by her to not go through with it. In March or April of 1969, he attempted to rape his stepmother in the bathroom, hitting her on the head and strangling her, but he again failed to complete the act. Following this latest attack, his stepmother lodged a complaint that brought on an investigation by DDASS, which resulted in Tissier being interned at a psychiatric facility for adolescents. After spending some time there, he was ruled as "cured" and released.

Following his release, he was hired as a gas station attendant and started a relationship with 16-year-old Marie-Françoise Pinson, an apprentice hairdresser he had met at a bar. On May 1, 1971, as he was awaiting summons for military service, the couple decided to go out on a dance in Bourges and later walk along the river. On the way, Tissier asked to have sex with Pinson, but after she refused, he proceeded to strangle her, tear off her clothes, rape the body several times and ultimately throw it into the river. Pinson's body was discovered on the next day, with suspicions quickly turning towards her boyfriend. Just two days later, he was arrested at a hotel room in downtown Bourges and placed in a youth lock-up, as he was still considered a minor.

On April 25, 1972, Tissier's trial before the cour d'assises in Cher began. He was found guilty of the murder and sentenced to 20 years imprisonment, with the fact that he was still a minor at the time of the crime allowing him to avoid the death penalty or life imprisonment.

Imprisonment, parole and recidivism
During his stay at the Bourges Prison, Tissier was considered a model prisoner, and due to this, his sentence was reduced to 18 years imprisonment in 1976. Through 1982, he was allowed five furloughs which went smoothly, and on December 15 of that year, he was left for the sixth time. A week later, he confronted a young secretary eating food in her car outside Toulouse, whom he threatened with a shotgun. After forcing her out of the car and into his own, he drove out of town and raped her before fleeing the crime scene. The day after, Tissier attempted to rape a second woman, but only succeeded in stealing her purse. Following this, he committed numerous thefts in order to finance his escapade.

In April 1983, Tissier was identified by passers-by as the perpetrator of a robbery in Nice, for which he was quickly arrested and soon charged with rape, attempted rape and aggravated theft. He was tried for the crimes in 1985, found guilty, and sentenced to 10 years imprisonment.

1990s
On January 4, 1992, Tissier was paroled yet again, whereupon he moved to Perpignan in an attempt to start a new life by a joining a community of Mormons. There he met the Volckaerts, with whom he developed a great friendship and was even named "Uncle Patrick" by the children. At the time, the family was unaware of his criminal record, and simply considered him a nice and helpful acquaintance.

On August 6, 1993, Tissier killed his next-door neighbor, 45-year-old Concetta Lemma, whom he likely raped and then strangled. After killing her, he tied her body up and wrapped it up in a shower curtain, before hiding it an underground tunnel in Canohès. An investigation was opened into the woman's disappearance, but as police were unable to uncover any clues, the case soon went cold. On September 10, Tissier raped a friend of his, 44-year-old Marie-Josée Gauze, whom he attempted to strangle with a scarf. Gauze resisted, however, which caused him to violently hit her against the ground several times, causing her to faint. While she was unconscious, Tissier bound, undressed and raped her, but just as he was about to kill her, she woke up and attempted to talk him out of this. To her relief, he calmed down and let her go.

Three days later, Tissier was waiting in the parking lot of the local elementary school for 8-year-old Karine Volckaert, the daughter of his Mormon friends. As she knew him well, Volckaert gladly accepted a ride home from him, but on the way, Tissier proposed that they stop by a warehouse to play a game. Once there, he handcuffed and gagged the girl before putting a hood on her, forcing her to sit on a seat and hide. He then went to Fitou and parked the car outside, before putting Volckaert in the back, where he raped her. Because she fiercely resisted, Tissier started hitting her, and after finally realizing what he had just done, he ultimately strangled her. After raping the body anew, he carried it to a nearby abandoned house and threw it down a well, which he then threw garbage on in an attempt to hide it.

Arrest and investigation
On September 21, 1993, Tissier was arrested by gendarmes in Paulhan following a brief chase, surrendering without any resistance. A search of his car revealed several weapons. During subsequent interrogations, he confessed to murdering Volckaert and to assaulting Gauze, and even told the investigators where they could find the little girl's body. Following his confessions, Tissier caused a debate in the media over recidivism and the morality of releasing dangerous offenders.

On February 1, 1994, Pierre Méhaignerie, the then-Minister of Justice, proposed a new law which eliminated the possibility of parole for offenders convicted of rapes or murders of minors, thus preventing criminals like Tissier from committing further vile acts. Twenty five dates after proposition, Volckaert's uncle, Dominique Milluy, took the director of the Perpignan mayor's office hostage at gunpoint and demanded that Tissier be handed over to him. He later peacefully surrendered himself, without any serious injuries being caused.

In September 1995, Tissier was questioned by the investigators about the disappearance of Lemma, with him eventually admitting that he had strangled and then dismembered her body. He initially claimed to have dumped the remains in a pond in Fitou, but after several months worth of searches turned up nothing, Tissier admitted that he had lied and that he had actually buried it somewhere else. On September 13, 1996, he was taken out of his cell and questioned again, and this time he finally admitted to concealing Lemma's body in the underground tunnel in Canohès. Three days later, an excavation team dispatched to the site uncovered her remains, and Tissier was subsequently charged with her murder.

Trial and imprisonment
On January 26, 1998, Tissier's trial began at the cour d'assises in Perpignan. Psychiatric examinations presented during the proceedings concluded that he did not suffer from any mental illnesses, and that he instead could not control his inclinations towards physical and sexual violence, due to which he tortured his victims. When questioned, Tissier declared that he had 'wanted' Volckaert and had felt insatiable urges on the weekend before killing her. When pressed as to why he waited an entire weekend between assaulting Gauze and killing Volckaert, he said that he was afraid that the police would catch him and that's why he laid low. At the end of the trial, Tissier apologized for all the crimes and expressed his wish that the city of Perpignan never had 'another Patrick Tissier'.

On January 30, 1998, Tissier was found guilty on all counts and sentenced to life imprisonment with 30 years of preventative detention. His projected release date is in September 2023.

Since his conviction, Gauze has retold the story of her attack on the TV show 'Rescapées de tueurs en série', explaining what had happened on that fateful night.

List of victims

See also
 List of French serial killers
 List of serial rapists

References

Bibliography

Documentaries
 "The Patrick Tissier case" in 2002 in Autopsy of a murder on 13th street.
 "Patrick Tissier, the recidivist" in May 2008 and December 2009 in "Get the Accused" presented by Christophe Hondelatte on France 2.
 "Karine, 8 years old" first report of the "Special: they have recidivated" in Crimes broadcast on April 6, 13 and 21, 2015 on NRJ 12.
 "In the eyes of Olivier: they were close to death", reports and interviews of several people including Marie-Josée Gauze. Posted on September 16, 2015 on France 2.

1952 births
20th-century French criminals
French male criminals
French murderers of children
French people convicted of murder
French people convicted of rape
French prisoners and detainees
French prisoners sentenced to life imprisonment
French rapists
French serial killers
Living people
Male serial killers
Necrophiles
People convicted of murder by France
People convicted of theft
People from Bourges
Prisoners and detainees of France
Prisoners sentenced to life imprisonment by France
Violence against women in France